Benjamín Ramón Astudillo is an Argentine football defender who played for Argentina in the 1934 FIFA World Cup. He also played for Colón de Santa Fe.

References

External links

Argentina international footballers
Association football defenders
1934 FIFA World Cup players
Argentine footballers
Argentine people of Spanish descent
Year of birth missing
Year of death missing